, is a railway station in Ōta, Tokyo, Japan, operated by the private railway company Keikyu.

Lines
Keikyu Kamata Station is served by the Keikyu Main Line and Keikyu Airport Line.

This station is a reversing station for direct train services between Yokohama Station and Haneda Airport.

Station layout
As of 21 October 2012, the station structure has three levels.

Platforms
The 3rd floor consists of one large platform serving three tracks in a unique configuration. Platforms 1 and 4 are equipped with platform screen doors.

3rd floor

2nd floor

History
The Airport Line (then called the Haneda Branch Line) was opened in 1902. Kamata Station was renamed  in November 1925, and again renamed Keikyū Kamata Station, the present name, on 1 June 1987.

In 1995, the platforms were extended to accommodate longer 12-car trains.

The station was rebuilt over a period of 12 years from December 2000 to October 2012 with the original ground-level tracks elevated to provide additional track capacity and eliminate road congestion on the three level crossings immediately adjacent to the station. As a result, the project won the Good Design Award presented by the Japan Institute of Design Promotion.

Keikyu introduced station numbering to its stations on 21 October 2010; Keikyū Kamata was assigned station number KK11.

Future plans
Plans exist to extend the Tokyu Tamagawa Line from Kamata Station eastward by approximately 800 m to Keikyu Kamata Station. This would provide an interchange between the lines, improving accessibility to Tokyo's Haneda Airport ahead of the 2020 Summer Olympics. These plans never materialized before the Olympics. , Ōta Ward has agreed with the Tokyo Metropolitan Government to pay 70% of the project cost of  while having the city government responsible for the remaining 30%.

Surrounding area
 Ota Ward Office
 Kamata Station (JR Keihin-Tohoku Line)
 PiO (Plaza Industry Ota)
 National Route 15

Gallery

References

External links

 Keikyu Kamata Station information (Keikyu) 

Railway stations in Japan opened in 1901
Keikyū Main Line
Keikyū Airport Line
Railway stations in Tokyo
Ōta, Tokyo